The 1999 European Parliament election in Ireland was the Irish component of the 1999 European Parliament election. The election was conducted under the single transferable vote.

Results

MEPs elected

Voting details

See also
List of members of the European Parliament for Ireland, 1999–2004 – List ordered by constituency

External links
ElectionsIreland.org – 1999 European Parliament (Ireland) election results
European Parliament elections 1999

Footnotes

1999 in Irish politics
Ireland
European 1999
Euro